Afriland First Bank is a full-service bank in Cameroon, with subsidiaries in the Democratic Republic of the Congo, Equatorial Guinea, Guinea, Liberia, South Sudan, São Tomé and Príncipe and Zambia. The bank was founded in Yaoundé in 1987 under the name of Caisse Commune d'Epargne et d'Investissement. It is the largest financial services group in Cameroon.

Overview
The bank is a large financial services provider in with global customer deposits in excess of €2,840,404,000, as of December 2016. The bank with its subsidiaries around the world had a combined asset base valued at €2.98 billion in December 2016.

Subsidiaries
 the bank maintains subsidiaries in the following countries:

 Equatorial Guinea  - CCEI Bank GE
 São Tomé and Príncipe  - First Bank São Tomé and Príncipe
 Democratic Republic of the Congo  - Afriland First Bank DRC
 Liberia  - Afriland First Bank Liberia
 South Sudan  - Afriland First Bank South Sudan
 Guinea  - Afriland First Bank Guinea
 Ivory Coast  - Afriland First Bank Ivory Coast
 Zambia  - Intermarket Bank (80 percent shareholding)

The banking group was granted a commercial banking license by the Bank of Uganda, in September 2019. After starting operations on 1 December 2020, the subsidiary voluntarily surrendered its banking license in May 2022, following a "strategic business review" by Afriland Group, who were the shareholders.

Representative offices
In the following countries, the bank has representative offices only:

 Paris, France  - Afriland First Bank Paris
 Beijing, China,  - Afriland First Bank China
 Brazzaville, Republic of the Congo  - Afriland First Bank Congo Brazzaville

Branch network
, the bank maintains 32 networked branches inside the Republic of Cameroon.

See also
 List of banks in Cameroon
 Economy of Cameroon
 Yaoundé

References

External links
 Afriland First Bank
 Company Profile At Bloomberg BusinessWeek

Banks of Cameroon
Banks established in 1987
Economy of Cameroon
Yaoundé